Bolitha James Laws (August 22, 1891 – November 14, 1958) was a United States district judge of the United States District Court for the District of Columbia.

Education and career

Born in Washington, D.C., Laws received a Bachelor of Laws from Georgetown Law in 1913, and a Master of Laws from the same institution in 1914. He was an Assistant United States Attorney for the District of Columbia from 1914 to 1920. He was in private practice in New York City, New York from 1920 to 1921, and was a litigation counsel and assistant general counsel to the United States Shipping Board's Emergency Fleet Corporation from 1921 to 1922. He then returned to private practice in Washington, D.C., from 1922 to 1938.

Federal judicial service
Laws was nominated by President Franklin D. Roosevelt on June 10, 1938, to the District Court of the United States for the District of Columbia, to a new Associate Justice seat authorized by 52 Stat. 584. He was confirmed by the United States Senate on June 16, 1938, and received his commission on June 24, 1938. He served as a Judge of the Emergency Court of Appeals from 1943 to 1958. His service terminated on February 23, 1945, due to his elevation to Chief Justice of the same court.

Laws was nominated by President Roosevelt on January 19, 1945, to the Chief Justice seat on the District Court of the United States for the District of Columbia vacated by Chief Justice Edward C. Eicher. He was confirmed by the Senate on February 22, 1945, and received his commission on February 23, 1945. Laws was reassigned by operation of law to the United States District Court for the District of Columbia on September 1, 1948, to a new judge seat authorized by 62 Stat. 869. He served as Chief Justice from 1948 until his death on November 14, 1958 and was also a member of the Judicial Conference of the United States during that year.

References

Sources
 

1891 births
1958 deaths
Lawyers from Washington, D.C.
Lawyers from New York City
Georgetown University Law Center alumni
Judges of the United States District Court for the District of Columbia
United States district court judges appointed by Franklin D. Roosevelt
20th-century American judges
Assistant United States Attorneys